The City of Ryde is a local government area in the Northern Sydney region, in the state of New South Wales, Australia. It was first established as the Municipal District of Ryde in 1870, became a municipality in 1906 and was proclaimed as the City of Ryde in 1992.

The local government area extends from the Parramatta River to the Lane Cove River which encircles the area in the north, and is bounded in the east by the peninsula of Hunters Hill and the City of Parramatta in the west.

The Mayor of the City of Ryde since 13 December 2022 is Cr. Sarkis Yedelian OAM a member of the Liberal Party.

Suburbs and localities in the local government area 
The following suburbs and localities are within the City of Ryde:

 Chatswood West (shared with City of Willoughby)
 Denistone
 Denistone East
 Denistone West
 East Ryde
 Eastwood (shared with City of Parramatta Council)
 Gladesville (shared with Municipality of Hunter's Hill)
 Macquarie Centre
 Macquarie Park
 Macquarie University campus
 Marsfield
 Meadowbank
 Melrose Park (shared with City of Parramatta Council)
 North Ryde
 Putney
 Ryde
 Tennyson Point
 Top Ryde
 West Ryde

Heritage listings
The City of Ryde has a number of heritage-listed sites, including:
 Denistone, 1-13 Pennant Avenue: The Hermitage
 Eastwood, Marsden Road: Brush Farm
 Gladesville, 144 Ryde Road: Gladesville Drill Hall
 Ryde, 782 Victoria Road: Willandra, Ryde
 Ryde, 808-810 Victoria Road: Ryde police station
 Ryde, 813 Victoria Road: Addington House
 Ryde, 817 Victoria Road: The Retreat, Ryde
 West Ryde, 135 Marsden Road: Riverview House, West Ryde
 West Ryde, Victoria Road: Ryde Pumping Station

Demographics 

At the 2016 census, there were  people in the Ryde local government area, of these 48.6% were male and 51.4% were female. Aboriginal and Torres Strait Islander people made up 0.4% of the population. The median age of people in the City of Ryde was 36 years. Children aged 0 – 14 years made up 16.2% of the population and people aged 65 years and over made up 14.3% of the population. Of people in the area aged 15 years and over, 51% were married and 8.3% were either divorced or separated.

Population growth in the City of Ryde between the 2006 Census and the 2011 Census was 6.28%, and in the subsequent five years to the 2016 Census, population growth was 12.87%. When compared with total population growth of Australia of 8.81% during the same period, population growth in the Ryde local government area was approximately 50% higher than the national average. The median weekly income for residents within the City of Ryde was around 25% above the national average. At the 2016 Census, the Ryde local government area was linguistically diverse, with a significantly higher than average proportion (51.1%) where two or more languages are spoken (national average was 22.2%); and a significantly lower proportion (47.7%) where English only was spoken at home (national average was 72.7%).

Council

Current composition and election method
The City of Ryde is composed of twelve Councillors elected proportionally as three separate wards, each electing four Councillors. All Councillors are elected for a fixed four-year term of office. The Mayor is elected by the Councillors for a two-year term at the first meeting of the council. The most recent election was held on 4 December 2021. 
The makeup of the council is as follows:

The current Council, elected in 2021, in order of election by ward, is:

Referendum on the position of mayor
A referendum was also undertaken at the election held on 4 December 2021, asking residents the following question: "Do you support a popularly elected Mayor where the voters of the City of Ryde elect the Mayor for a four (4) year term, thereby adopting a thirteen (13) Councillor model (including the Mayor)?". The final declared results were: 76.18% YES and 23.82% NO. As a result, the position of mayor will be directly elected from the next local government elections scheduled for 2024.

Council history

In June 1870, 201 residents of the district of Ryde sent a petition to the Governor, requesting the incorporation of the "Municipal District of Ryde". This resulted in the municipality being formally proclaimed on 11 November 1870. With a total land area of 40.6 square kilometres, Ryde was the largest Sydney municipality. However, due to an error in the proclamation regarding the western boundary, a new proclamation was made on 11 June 1872.

In June 1894 the northern section of the municipality known as Marsfield, was proclaimed as the "Municipal District of Marsfield". In 1907, Marsfield became known as the Municipality of Eastwood, and lasted until it was re-amalgamated with Ryde following the passing of the Local Government (Areas) Act 1948.

With the passing of the Local Government Act, 1906, the council name was changed to be the "Municipality of Ryde". The City of Ryde was proclaimed in 1992, marking the bicentenary of the first land grants in Ryde, and with the passing of the Local Government Act 1993, aldermen were also retitled councillors.

A 2015 review of local government boundaries by the NSW Government Independent Pricing and Regulatory Tribunal recommended that the City of Ryde merge with adjoining councils. In July 2017, the Berejiklian government decided to abandon the forced merger of the Hunter's Hill, Lane Cove and Ryde local government areas, along with several other proposed forced mergers.

Town Clerks and General Managers

Mayors

International relations
  Stepanakert, Republic of Artsakh: The City of Ryde established a Friendship Declaration with Stepanakert, the capital of the partially recognized Republic of Artsakh on 23 July 2019.
  Ryde, Isle of Wight

Coat of arms

Notes

References

External links 
 City of Ryde website

 
Ryde
Ryde